Rostam Kandi may refer to:
 Rostam Kandi, East Azerbaijan
 Rostam Kandi, Kurdistan